Education in the Isle of Man is compulsory for children aged between 5 and 16. As a Crown dependency the Isle of Man parliament and government have competence over all domestic matters, including education; however the structure and curriculum are broadly in line with that of UK schools and particularly the English national curriculum. Education is overseen by the Department of Education, Sport and Culture and regulated by the Isle of Man Education Act 2001. As of September 2017 there were 6,492 pupils in primary schools, and 5,218 pupils in secondary education.

History

Before 1675 there were no schools in the Isle of Man and any education was provided by the church. This changed with the arrival of Bishop Isaac Barrow, who established a school in every parish.

Education system
The education system in the Isle of Man is similar to the system used in England. Primary school consists of seven years, and secondary school of seven years. All five secondary schools in the Isle of Man have a sixth form centre.

 Primary education
 Foundation Stage
 Reception, age 4 to 5
 Key Stage 1
 Year 1, age 5 to 6
 Year 2, age 6 to 7
 Key Stage 2
 Year 3, age 7 to 8
 Year 4, age 8 to 9
 Year 5, age 9 to 10
 Year 6, age 10 to 11
 Secondary education
 Key Stage 3
 Year 7, age 11 to 12 
 Year 8, age 12 to 13
 Year 9, age 13 to 14
 Key Stage 4
 Year 10, age 14 to 15
 Year 11, age 15 to 16 (GCSE examinations)
 Sixth form
 Year 12, age 16 to 17 (AS-level examinations)
 Year 13, age 17 to 18 (A-levels examinations)

Schools

The Department of Education operates 32 primary schools and 5 secondary schools. Among the primary schools, Bunscoill Ghaelgagh is the only school in the world where children are taught mainly in Manx. Independent schools include King William's College and its junior school, The Buchan School.

Further and higher education
 Centre for Manx Studies, University of Liverpool, Douglas (until 2015, now located in Liverpool)
 Isle of Man International Business School, Douglas
 University College Isle of Man, Douglas
 Manx Academy of Performing Arts, Douglas
 Manx Professional Educational Services, Douglas

See also
 Manx Heritage Foundation
 Bishop Barrow Trust
 Manx Telecomputer Bus

References

External links

 Isle of Man Government Department of Education
 Isle of Man Schools page
 History of Education In the Isle of Man. R.B. MOORE, Esq., Education Week, 1926
 History - Government Building (formally Hanover Street School), Lord Street, Douglas, Isle of Man, IM1 1LE